Jock McKenzie (born 9 November 2001) is a New Zealand rugby union player who plays for the  in Super Rugby. His playing position is fly-half or fullback. He was named in the Blues squad for the rescheduled Round 1 of the 2022 Super Rugby Pacific season. He made his debut in the same match, coming on as a replacement. He was also named in the  squad for the 2021 Bunnings NPC, but didn't make an appearance.

References

2001 births
New Zealand rugby union players
Living people
Rugby union fly-halves
Rugby union fullbacks
Auckland rugby union players
Blues (Super Rugby) players